Sirab (also Romanized as Sīrāb) is a village in Razan Rural District, in the Central District of Razan County, Hamadan Province, Iran. At the 2006 census, its population was 330, in 74 families.

References 

 Populated places in Razan County